Kydliny is a village located about 4.5 kilometers to the west of Klatovy in the Czech Republic. It was first mentioned in 1352, and its Church of Saint Wenceslas, a cultural monument of the Czech Republic, dates back to that year. In 2011 there were 85 inhabitants and 59 houses dedicated for living.

Gallery

References 

Villages in Klatovy District